The National Policing Institute, formerly known as the Police Foundation, is an American non-profit organization dedicated to advancing policing through innovation and independent scientific research. It is headquartered in Arlington, Virginia.

History 
Since its creation in 1970 by the Ford Foundation, the National Policing Institute has conducted research in police behavior, policy, and procedure, and continues efforts in new evidence-based practices and innovations in policing.

The National Policing Institute has conducted studies and evaluations in policing, including the Kansas City preventive patrol experiment, that examined the effects of preventive patrol on crime, the Newark Foot Patrol Experiment that examined the effectiveness of foot patrol on reducing crime and Reducing the Fear of Crime in Houston and Newark, that assessed community perceptions of police and safety, and the Shift Length Experiment, which tested the impacts of different police shift lengths on patrol officers and agencies.

One early study, “Women in Policing,” that found significant underrepresentation among women in policing, leading the Institute to establish a Research Center on Women in Policing to encourage greater hiring of women in law enforcement.

Research supported by the National Policing Institute and conducted by collaborating scholars was also featured in Malcolm Gladwell’s book Talking to Strangers: What We Should Know About the People We Don’t Know.

Current research and programs 
More recently the National Policing Institute has conducted research into police body cameras and officer safety training.

Following the murder of George Floyd, the National Policing Institute's Board or Directors authorized a $1 million campaign to support the Institute's policing reforms agenda, including the creation of a Council on Policing Reforms and Race, the creation of a visiting scholar on policing, race, and crime position, and two research experiments related to improving understanding of police labor relations and agreements and the efficacy of civilian oversight bodies.

Publications 
The National Policing Institute maintains a publication library as well as specialized collections, such as the After Action Review Library and the OnPolicing blog. The Institute publishes an annual report detailing its key work and accomplishments, new publications and financial overviews.

Organization 
The National Policing Institute is overseen by an independent Board of Directors and led by its President, Jim Burch. The Institute's divisions include Research Division, National Programs Division, Local Programs Division, International Division, the Center for Targeted Violence Prevention, Communications Division, and the Finance Division. As of 2021, the Institute has just under 50 staff and an annual operating budget of approximately $9 million.

Funding 
The National Policing Institute was launched exclusively with private support from the Ford Foundation (1970) but operates today with funding support from many public (federal, state and local governments) and private sources as well as donations.

References

External links 
 National Policing Institute homepage
 History page at the Institute's site

Law enforcement non-governmental organizations in the United States
Foundations based in the United States